Jangtaesan (Jang tae mountain) is located in the Jangan-dong neighbourhood of Daejeon, Korea. The Jangtaesan Natural Recreation Forest is the only metasequoia forest in Korea. Regular maintenance keeps the forest healthy and safe for visitors.

Location 
Jangtaesan Natural Recreation Forest is the only metasequoia forest in Korea and is located in Jangan-dong, western Daejeon.

Maintenance considerations 
The Park Management Service in Daejeon maintains the metasequoia forest in the Jangtaesan Natural Recreation Forest to ensure the safety of visitors and the continued beauty of the forest. Since it has been 40 years since planting, the trees are large and the spacing between them has narrowed so that some branches are tilted to one side. Repairs are designed to prevent accidents, such as when dead branches fall. Maintenance in 2017 was planned to clean up some of the cracks and twigs. Targets were 980 metasequoia trees in the vicinity of major trails, mountain baths, as well as 98 metasequoia trees of adventure forest members. 

The maintenance work is based on the input of experts on forest status and stable management measures.

References

Seo District, Daejeon
Mountains of Daejeon